The Saga Ballooners is a professional basketball team that  competes in the second division of the Japanese B.League.

Coaches
Aljosa Bjekovic
Luis Guil Torres
Yuta Miyanaga

Roster

Notable players
Aljosa Bjekovic
Trey Gilder
Gary Hamilton
Kenny Lawson Jr.
Marcos Mata
Nick Washburn
Rintaro Tokunaga
Alan Wiggins

Arenas
Saga Sunrise Park General Gymnasium
Karatsu City Cultural Gymnasium
Morodomi Cultural Gymnasium

References

 
Basketball teams in Japan
Sports teams in Saga Prefecture
Basketball teams established in 2018
2018 establishments in Japan